Opilio is a genus of harvestmen with 35 known species.

Name
The genus name is derived from Latin opilio "sheep-master" (a kind of slave), used by Plautus, also used by Virgil with the meaning "shepherd".

Species
Opilio contains the following thirty-five species:
 Opilio afghanus Roewer, 1960
 Opilio apsheronicus Snegovaya, 2005
 Opilio arborphilus Snegovaya, 2010
 Opilio canestrinii (Thorell, 1876)
 Opilio caucasicus Snegovaya, 2010
 Opilio coxipunctus (Sørensen, 1911)
 Opilio decoratus Koch, 1878
 Opilio dinaricus Šilhavý, 1938
 Opilio ejuncidus (Thorell, 1876)
 Opilio grasshoffi Staręga, 1986
 Opilio hemseni Roewer, 1952
 Opilio himalincola Martens, 1973
 Opilio insulae Roewer, 1956
 Opilio kakunini Snegovaya, Cokendolpher & Mozaffarian, 2018
 Opilio lederi Roewer, 1911
 Opilio lepidus Koch, 1879
 Opilio magnus Hadži, 1973
 Opilio minutus Meade, 1855
 Opilio morini Snegovaya, 2016
 Opilio nabozhenkoi Snegovaya, 2010
†Opilio ovalis Berendt & Koch, 1854
 Opilio parietinus (De Geer, 1778)
 Opilio putnik Karaman, 1999
 Opilio ravennae Spoek, 1962
 Opilio rossicus Snegovaya, 2016
 Opilio rutilus Morin, 1934
 Opilio ruzickai Šilhavý, 1938
 Opilio saxatilis Koch, 1839
 Opilio setipenis Snegovaya, 2008
 Opilio shirvanicus Snegovaya, 2005
 Opilio silhavyi Kratochvíl, 1936
 Opilio silvestris Snegovaya, 2010
 Opilio transversalis Roewer, 1956
 Opilio trispinifrons Roewer, 1911
 Opilio validus Roewer, 1959

References

Harvestmen